is a Japanese shōjo manga artist, best known for the manga Saint Tail, which was also adapted into an anime series. She made her manga debut in 1992 with 16-sai no Tiara, which was nominated for the 'New Face' manga award.

Works
The Wildcat Constellation (one-shot)
16-sai no Tiara (16歳のティアラ) (one-shot)
Asagao no Portrait (one-shot)
Haru wo Yobu Orugoru (one-shot)
Kujira ga Tonda Hi (one-shot)
Hi~ Fu~ Mi~ (one-shot)
Manatsu ni Just Meet (one-shot)
Hot Typhoon (熱烈台風娘 read ホットタイフーン Hotto Taifūn)
Yumekui Annainin (夢食案内人) subtitled: "The Dream-Eating Guidance Girl"
Saint Tail (怪盗セイント・テール Kaitou Saint Tail)
Dream Saga (夢幻伝説 タカマガハラ Mugen Densetsu Takamagahara, subtitled Dream Saga)
Cyber Idol Mink (電脳少女☆Mink Dennō Shōjo Mink)
Delivery Boy ~ The Legendary House Keeper ("Delivery Boy ~ Densetsu no House Keeper")

References

Ultimate Manga Guide page on Tachikawa

External links
MEGUMI-YA Tachikawa's specialty publishing site

Living people
People from Tokyo
Women manga artists
Manga artists from Tokyo
Japanese female comics artists
Year of birth missing (living people)